The High Plains Regional Climate Center (HPRCC) is one of the six regional climate centers in the United States. It is managed by the National Centers for Environmental Information, and operated by the University of Nebraska-Lincoln's School of Natural Resources.

The HPRCC provides climate products and services to the High Plains Region, comprising Colorado, Kansas, Nebraska, North Dakota, South Dakota and Wyoming.

Climate summary maps 

HPRCC is the daily producer of the Applied Climate Information System (ACIS) climate summary maps.

Automated Weather Data Network 
HPRCC, along with Colorado, Iowa, Kansas, Nebraska, North Dakota and Wyoming, uses the Automated Weather Data Network to provide information to agricultural producers.

References

External links 
 

Climate change organizations based in the United States